Max the Pickpocket is a 1962 West German comedy crime film directed by Imo Moszkowicz and starring Heinz Rühmann, Elfie Pertramer and Hans Clarin.

It was made at the Bavaria Studios in Munich.

Synopsis
A small-time pickpocket investigates when his brother-in-law is murdered.

Cast
 Heinz Rühmann as Max Schilling
 Elfie Pertramer as Pauline Schilling
 Hans Clarin as Fred
 Ruth Stephan as Desiree
 Hans Hessling as Arthur
 Lotte Ledl as Lizzy
 Benno Sterzenbach as Charly Gibbons
 Harald Maresch as Joe
 Frithjof Vierock as Egon Schilling
 Hans Leibelt
 Ulrich Beiger as Alleinunterhalter
 Hans Jürgen Diedrich
 Helga Anders as Brigitte
 Gernot Duda
 Arno Assmann as Polizeiinspektor Friedrich

References

Bibliography 
 Bock, Hans-Michael & Bergfelder, Tim. The Concise CineGraph. Encyclopedia of German Cinema. Berghahn Books, 2009.

External links 
 

1962 films
1960s crime comedy films
German crime comedy films
West German films
1960s German-language films
Films directed by Imo Moszkowicz
Bavaria Film films
Films shot at Bavaria Studios
1962 comedy films
1960s German films